Mouhssine Lahsaini (born 23 August 1985) is a Moroccan road bicycle racer. He competed at the 2012 Summer Olympics in the Men's road race, and in the men's time trial, finishing 34th, 6 minutes and 45 seconds behind winner Bradley Wiggins.

Major results

2006
 1st Stage 10 Tour du Maroc
 9th Overall Tour du Faso
1st Stage 11
2007
 1st  Pan Arab Games
 3rd Road race, National Road Championships
 3rd Overall Tour du Faso
1st Young rider classification
1st Stage 1
 7th Overall Tour du Maroc
 7th Overall Tour du Sénégal
2008
 8th H. H. Vice-President's Cup
2009
 2nd Overall Tour du Faso
1st Stage 2
 3rd Road race, National Road Championships
 3rd Circuit Hammadi Chennaf
 6th Grand Prix of Sharm el-Sheikh
 8th Time trial, African Road Championships
 8th Overall Tour of Rwanda
1st Stages 5 & 8
2010
 1st  Time trial, National Road Championships
 1st Overall Tour du Mali
 1st Casablanca - Azemmour
 1st H. H. Vice-President's Cup
 Les Challenges de la Marche Verte
1st GP Sakia El Hamra
4th GP Oued Eddahab
6th GP Al Massira
 3rd Overall 2009–10 UCI Africa Tour
 6th Overall Tour du Maroc
 Challenge du Prince
6th Trophée de la Maison Royale
7th Trophée Princier
8th Trophée de l'Anniversaire
 9th Time trial, African Road Championships
2011
 National Road Championships
1st  Time trial
4th Road race
 1st Overall Tour du Maroc
1st Stage 8
 1st Coupe du Trône
 1st Rabat - FUS
 Pan Arab Games
1st  Team time trial
2nd  Time trial
2nd  Team road race
 3rd Moroccan Season Opener
 African Road Championships
3rd  Team time trial
5th Time trial
8th Road race
 4th Challenge Youssoufia, Challenge des phosphates
 5th Overall 2010–11 UCI Africa Tour
 6th Trophée Princier, Challenge du Prince
 7th Circuit d'Alger
2012
 National Road Championships
1st  Time trial
4th Road race
 1st Challenge Youssoufia, Challenge des phosphates
 1st Kalâat Sraghna - ACCC
 1st  Mountains classification Course de la Solidarité Olympique
 Les Challenges de la Marche Verte
3rd GP Sakia El Hamra
10th GP Oued Eddahab
 5th Overall Tour du Maroc
 6th Trophée de la Maison Royale, Challenge du Prince
 8th Circuit d'Alger
2013
 Challenge du Prince
3rd Trophée Princier
9th Trophée de l'Anniversaire
9th Trophée de la Maison Royale
2014
 Les Challenges de la Marche Verte
1st GP Oued Eddahab
4th GP Sakia El Hamra
 1st Critérium International de Sétif
 1st Trophée de l'Anniversaire, Challenge du Prince
 2nd Time trial, National Road Championships
 2nd Overall Tour du Maroc
 5th Overall Tour d'Algérie
2015
 1st Overall Tour de Côte d'Ivoire
1st Stage 2 (ITT)
 1st Overall Grand Prix Chantal Biya
 1st Overall Tour du Faso
 Challenge des phosphates
1st Grand Prix de Khouribga
9th Grand Prix de Ben Guerir
 National Road Championships
2nd Time trial
3rd Road race
 6th Overall Tour d'Egypte
 7th Overall Sharjah International Cycling Tour
 Challenge du Prince
7th Trophée de l'Anniversaire
8th Trophée de la Maison Royale
10th Trophée Princier
 8th Time trial, African Road Championships
2016
 African Road Championships
1st  Time trial
3rd  Team time trial
 Challenge du Prince
1st Trophée de la Maison Royale
4th Trophée de l'Anniversaire
 National Road Championships
2nd Time trial
2nd Road race
 9th Overall Tour de Tunisie
2017
 National Road Championships
1st  Time trial
5th Road race
 5th Overall Tour du Maroc
2018
 9th Overall Tour International de la Wilaya d'Oran

References

External links

Moroccan male cyclists
1985 births
Living people
Olympic cyclists of Morocco
Cyclists at the 2012 Summer Olympics
Cyclists at the 2016 Summer Olympics